Drumcliffe is an alternative spelling of Drumcliff and can refer to:
 Drumcliff - village in County Sligo, Republic of Ireland
 Drumcliff, County Clare -  a civil parish including Inch and part of Ennis, County Clare, Republic of Ireland
 Drumcliffe/Rosses Point GAA, a football club in north County Sligo, Republic of Ireland